Vaygach Island (Nenets: Вай Хабць, romanized: Vai Habcj’) an island in the Arctic Sea between the Pechora Sea and the Kara Sea.

Vaygach Island is separated from the Yugorsky Peninsula in the mainland by the Yugorsky Strait and from Novaya Zemlya by the Kara Strait. The island is a part of Nenets Autonomous Okrug of Arkhangelsk Oblast, Russia.
 Area: 
 Length: ~ 
 Width: up to 
 Average temperatures:  (February),  (June)
 Highest point: 

Vaygach Island is mainly formed of argillaceous slates, sandstone, and limestone. For the most part it consists of tundra. Slight rocky ridges run generally along its length, and the coast has low cliffs in places. The island consists mostly of limestone, and its elevation above the sea is geologically recent. Raised beaches are frequent. The rocks are heavily scored by ice, but this was probably marine ice, not that of glaciers. The only settlement on the island is Varnek.

Fauna and flora
Grasses, mosses and Arctic flowering plants are abundant, but there are no trees excepting occasional dwarf willows. Foxes and lemmings are spotted occasionally. While there are not many land animals on the island, birds are very numerous; a variety of ducks, waders etc. frequent the marshes and lakes. At least five polar bears are known to inhabit the island.

Nature reserve
In July 2007, the World Wide Fund for Nature (WWF) and the Russian government approved a nature reserve on Vaygach island. The island's surrounding seas are home to many marine mammals such as walruses, seals and endangered whales.

Ethnography
The name of the island translates from the Nenets as "alluvial shore", or by another account Vaygach means ‘terrible death’ or ‘territory of death’ in the local language.

Until the 19th century, the island was an important shrine of the Nenets people. On the island of Vaygach since ancient times, two idols were worshiped. One, named Vesako, on the south end of the island. The other on the north is Hadako. 
There were also polycephalic wooden idols painted with blood of holy animals, primarily reindeer. Some of their sacrificial piles, consisting of drift-wood, deer's horns and the skulls of bears and deer, have been observed by travellers. In spite of their conversion to Christianity, the Nenets still regard these piles with superstition.

See also
 List of islands of Russia

Notes

Further reading
 F. G. Jackson. Great Frozen Land. London, 1895. Jackson made a circuit of the island by foot in 1893.
 H. J. Pearson. Beyond Petsora Eastward. London, 1899.
 Vaigach - The "Easter Island of the Arctic"

Islands of the Barents Sea
Islands of Nenets Autonomous Okrug
Islands of the Kara Sea
Populated places of Arctic Russia